Kindred: The Embraced is an American television series produced by John Leekley Productions and Spelling Television. Loosely based on the role-playing game Vampire: The Masquerade, the series premiered on Fox on April 2, 1996, and ran for seven episodes before it was canceled with one episode unaired on May 9, 1996. Scripts for two other episodes were never filmed.

Synopsis
The series initially focused on San Francisco Police Detective Frank Kohanek (C. Thomas Howell) who discovers his city is home to numerous vampires while investigating alleged mobster Julian Luna (Mark Frankel). Julian is not really a mobster, as Frank thinks; in fact, he is the Prince of the city, the ruler of five groups of vampires in the city, collectively called "the Kindred". Frank had been romantically involved with Julian's former lover; Alexandra. Before Alexandra dies as punishment for breaking the "Masquerade" she asks Julian to protect Frank as a special favor to her; which he does. The two form an odd sort of friendship as the series progresses. Julian provides Frank with insights and information regarding the vampire community as related to crimes he is investigating. While Frank is able to act discreetly on Julian's behalf if needed. Further, Frank is shown to be somewhat resistant to a vampire's powers due to his past physical intimacy with a vampire.

Julian, in his role as Prince, is shown to be the only force that can stop the clans from breaking the uneasy truce that keeps them from fighting with each other. The vampires survive thanks to the "Masquerade", disguising themselves as humans, and Julian strictly enforces the laws that govern them to protect their anonymity. Any vampires who break those rules find their lives ended. Vampires are shown to slip into human society rather easily, holding a variety of jobs. The senior vampires who compose the conclave of San Francisco are depicted as wealthy heads of industry and business leaders.

Julian struggles with his romantic feelings for human reporter Caitlin Byrne (Kelly Rutherford). Further, Julian is assisted by and finds comfort in his trusted friend, Daedalus, who is the senior vampire for one of the five clans.

Characters

Main
 Julian Luna (Mark Frankel), a vampire of Clan Ventrue, and prince of the city
 Caitlin Byrne (Kelly Rutherford), a human journalist
 Lillie Langtry (Stacy Haiduk), a vampire, and leader of Clan Toreador
 Detective Frank Kohanek (C. Thomas Howell), a human police detective
 Sasha Luna (Brigid Walsh), the last human relative of Julian Luna

Recurring
 Cash (Channon Roe), a vampire of the Gangrel clan who falls in love with Sasha
 Daedalus (Jeff Kober), a vampire of the Nosferatu clan
 Eddie Fiori (Brian Thompson), a vampire of the Brujah clan
 Archon Raine (Patrick Bauchau), a vampire of the Ventrue clan, and the former prince of the city

Episodes

Release

Broadcast
The series premiered on Fox on April 2, 1996. New episodes aired weekly until May 9, 1996, after which the series was canceled and no additional episodes produced.

Home media
All eight episodes were released in a two volume DVD set on August 21, 2001. On August 5, 2013, it was announced that The Complete Series, packaged with the Book of Nod role-playing game supplement, would be released on October 22.

Reception
Sci Fi Weeklys Kathie Huddleston called Kindred: The Embraced a "cross between The Godfather and Melrose Place" that held promise, but was very confusing to viewers with the five vampire clans and a particularly confusing pilot episode. While she felt the character of Frank appeared "to be pulled straight out of a bad cop film," she praised the character of Julian as a "multifaceted character who's both good and evil." Ken Tucker of Entertainment Weekly also compared the series to The Godfather "soaked in blood," calling it "knottily mystifying." Like Huddleston, he disliked the character of Frank, wishing he'd been killed by a vampire early in the series, while praising "the elegant, intelligent prince" Julian.

Reviews
Pyramid

See also
Vampire film
List of vampire television series

References

External links 
 
 
 Kindred the Embraced
 White Wolf Online

1996 American television series debuts
1996 American television series endings
Vampire: The Masquerade
Fox Broadcasting Company original programming
Vampires in television
Television series by CBS Studios
Television series by Spelling Television
Television shows based on role-playing games
English-language television shows
Television shows set in San Francisco
Television series about vampires